Habib Majeri or Habib Mejri is a Tunisian football player who played for Tunisia in the 1978 African Cup of Nations.

He later became a manager.

References

1951 births
Living people
Tunisian footballers
Tunisia international footballers
Association footballers not categorized by position
1978 African Cup of Nations players
CS Hammam-Lif players
Club Africain players
Ohod Club players
Tunisian Ligue Professionnelle 1 players
Saudi Professional League players
Tunisian expatriate footballers
Expatriate footballers in Saudi Arabia
Tunisian expatriate sportspeople in Saudi Arabia
Tunisian football managers
AS Marsa managers
CS Hammam-Lif managers
EGS Gafsa managers